= Prayono Atiyanto =

Indonesian diplomat (born 1958)

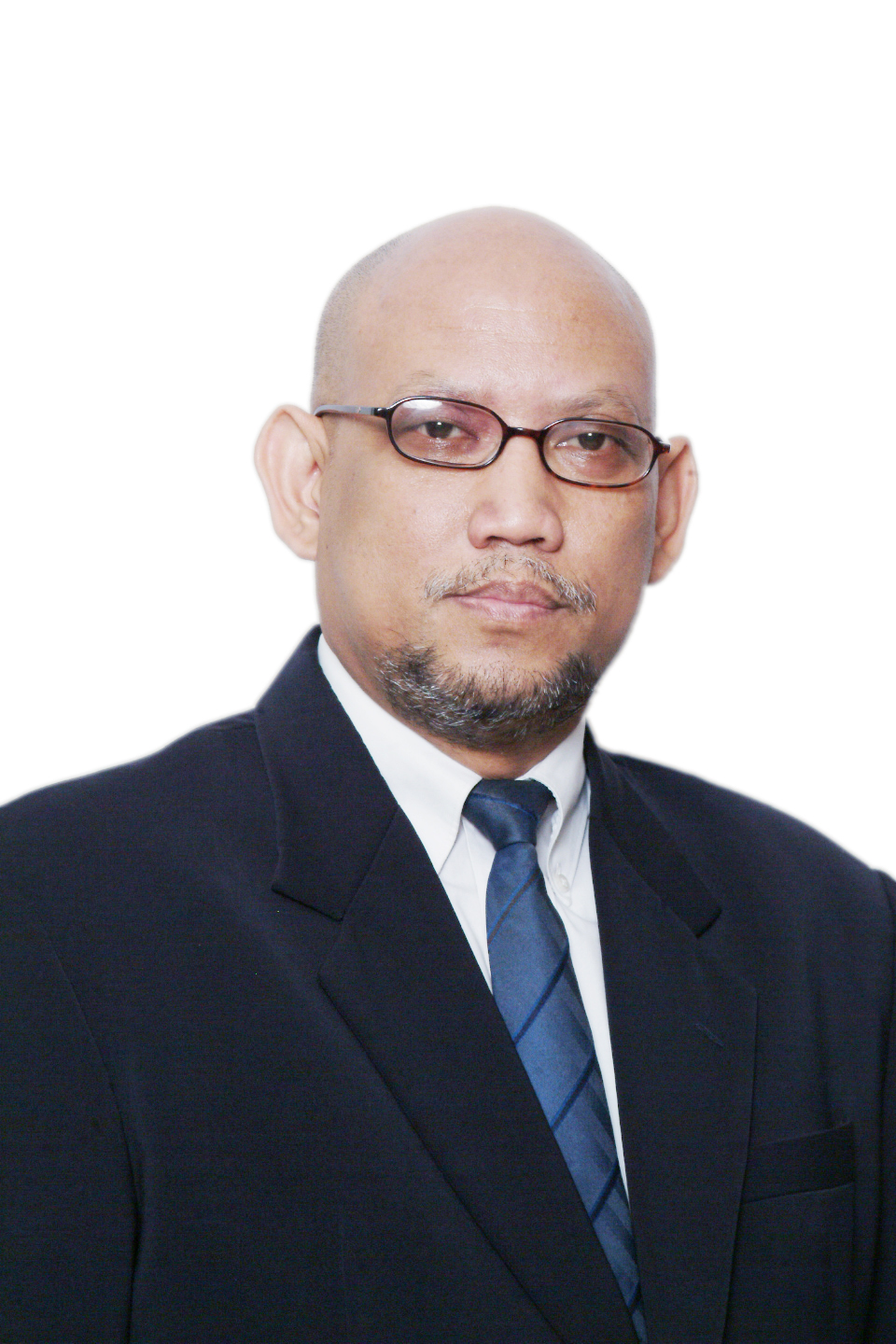

Ambassador of Indonesia to Azerbaijan
- In office 21 December 2011 – 31 January 2016
- President: Susilo Bambang Yudhoyono; Joko Widodo
- Preceded by: office established
- Succeeded by: Husnan Bey Fananie

Personal details
- Born: May 2, 1958 (age 68) Surabaya, Indonesia
- Education: University of Indonesia (Drs.)
- Occupation: Diplomat

Prayono Atiyanto (born 2 May 1958) is an Indonesian diplomat who served as Indonesia's inaugural resident ambassador to Azerbaijan, serving from 2011 to 2016. Prior to his ambassadorship, Prayono was the South America and Caribbean director within the foreign ministry.

== Early life and education ==
Born in Surabaya on 2 May 1958, Prayono studied political sciences at the University of Indonesia from 1978 until receiving his bachelor's degree in 1983.

== Diplomatic career ==
Prayono joined the foreign service in 1984 and completed his junior diplomatic education on the same year. Prayono began his career at the Africa and Middle East directorate in 1984 before being transferred to the directorate of economic relations among developing countries the next year. His first overseas posting was at the embassy in London in 1988, where he handled economic matters with the rank of third secretary until 1992. Upon his return, he was appointed as a section head at the directorate of economic relations among developing countries.

In 1995, Prayono was posted to the Permanent Mission of the Republic of Indonesia in New York, serving as a first secretary for economic affairs I until 1999. During this tenure, he played a significant role in multilateral negotiations, serving as the chairman of negotiators for the Group of 77 and China on Committee V (Administration and Budgetary) of the United Nations General Assembly in 1998, a year in which Indonesia presided over the Group of 77 and China in New York. Following this posting, he returned to Indonesia to serve as the head of administration for leadership support at the General Bureau of the Department of Foreign Affairs from 1999 to 2002, followed by a term as the assistant to the secretary general of the Department of Foreign Affairs between 2002 and 2003. Around this time, he completed his mid-level and senior diplomatic education in 1999 and 2001, respectively.

Prayono returned to the Permanent Mission of the Republic of Indonesia to the United Nations in New York in 2003, serving as a minister counsellor and coordinator of economic function I until 2007. During this period, he held several leadership roles within UN bodies, including vice chairman of the United Nations Commission for Social Development in 2004 and coordinator of the ASEAN delegation on Committee II (Economic and Financial) of the United Nations General Assembly from 2004 to 2007. Furthermore, he was elected as the vice chairman of Committee II during the 61st session of the United Nations General Assembly in 2006. In 2007, he was appointed as the South American and Caribbean director in the foreign ministry.

On 29 December 2010, Indonesia opened its embassy in Baku. Prayono was nominated by president Susilo Bambang Yudhoyono as Indonesia's first resident ambassador to the country and he passed an assessment conducted by the House of Representative's first commission in August 2011. Prayono was sworn in on 21 December 2011 and presented his letters of credence to president Ilham Aliyev on 7 February 2012. He departed Baku upon the end of his ambassadorial mission on 31 January 2016, with him meeting with Azerbaijan's foreign minister a few days prior on 16 January. During his tenure, heroversaw the increase of trade flow, with significant development regarding cooperation within the cultural sector.

After his ambassadorial tenure, Prayono was assigned to the directorate of Asian-African intra-regional and inter-regional cooperation, where he mentored junior diplomats on Indonesia's coffee diplomacy. Prayono promoted the usage of Kopi (the Indonesian word for coffee) as a brand to differentiate it from other types of coffee and urged coffee producers to include Indonesia within its product name. Prayono entered retirement in May 2023.
